Jorge Daniel Benítez Guillén (born 2 September 1992) is a Paraguayan professional footballer who plays as a forward for Club Atlético Colón.

Career

First stint at Guaraní
Benítez made his first professional appearance for Guaraní of the Paraguayan Primera División on 30 May 2010 against Olimpia. He came on as a 68th-minute substitute for Julián Benítez as Guaraní won 2–1.

Rubio Ñu
After receiving little playing time at Guaraní, Benítez made the move to Rubio Ñu in 2013. He scored his 2 March 2013 against Olimpia. His goal coming in the 74th minute to help make the match end 1–1.

Back at Guaraní
Benítez returned to Guaraní before the Clausura in 2013. He scored his first goal for the club in his first game back on 8 August 2013 against Oriente Petrolero in the Copa Sudamericana. He came on as a 78th-minute substitute and scored in the 93rd minute to give Guaraní a 4–1 victory. He scored his first double for the club on 6 June 2014 in the league against Cerro Porteño. His first goal came in the 1st minute while his second came in the 50th minute as Guaraní drew the match 5–5.

Olympiacos
On August 18, 2014, Benítez was signed by Olympiakos F.C. for $3.4 million, with 15% economic rights retained by his former club Club Guaraní. At his first season in the club, he did not play as much as he thought he would. However, he showed some of his enviable skills scoring some really beautiful goals.

On 26 July 2015, Jorge 'Conejo' Benitez, cameras and reporters rushed terrified to take the first impressions of the former player of Olympiakos who is being surrounded by recorder and merely he held microphones and said: "I come to make goals". Benitez will make the appropriate medical examinations and will sign his six months contract with the Mexican club Cruz Azul, on loan from Olympiakos. Eventually, a day later, Cruz Azul announced in its official website the lending of the player for the Apertura 2015.

On 26 March 2016, Olympiakos striker Benitez, who is currently on loan at Cruz Azul, is unlikely to return to the Greek giants. The Paraguayan striker is enjoying a great form at the Mexican club and rumours claimed that he could be on his way to Olympiakos when his loan expires. However, it is believed that Benitez does not wish to return to the Greek champions as he is very happy and settled in Cruz Azul. On 28 March 2016, Olympiakos have accepted a bid in the region of €4 million from Cruz Azul for the services of Jorge Benitez. Benitez was on loan at the Mexican club from Olympiakos as the Greek giants were ready to listen to offers.

Cruz Azul
On 14 May 2016, the Mexican club officially announced the acquisition of the Paraguayan international striker.

Monterrey
On 7 June 2017, the Paraguayan forward arrives at Rayados from Cruz Azul, a club in which he played for two seasons. The transfer takes place in definitive purchase by the Regio group, which also announced the departure of Edwin Cardona to Pachuca.

Club Sol de América
In September 2020, he signed for Club Sol de América.

Deportes La Serena
On 15 April 2021, he signed for Deportes La Serena.

Veraguas United Football Club
On 17 March 2022, he signed for Veraguas United Football Club.

Colón de Santa Fe
On 8 January 2023, Benitez was transferred to Colón de Santa Fe pf the Argentinian Primera Division.

International
Benítez made his international debut on 1 June 2014 against France. He came on as a 65th-minute substitute for Roque Santa Cruz as Paraguay drew the match 1–1.

HonoursOlympiacos'
Super League Greece: 2014–15
Greek Cup: 2014–15

Career statistics

References

External links
 

1992 births
Living people
Paraguayan footballers
Paraguayan expatriate footballers
Sportspeople from Asunción
Paraguay international footballers
Club Guaraní players
Club Rubio Ñu footballers
Cerro Porteño players
Olympiacos F.C. players
Cruz Azul footballers
Deportes La Serena footballers
C.F. Monterrey players
Club Sol de América footballers
Club Atlético Platense footballers
Association football forwards
Paraguayan Primera División players
Chilean Primera División players
Super League Greece players
Liga MX players
Argentine Primera División players
Copa América Centenario players
Paraguayan expatriate sportspeople in Chile
Paraguayan expatriate sportspeople in Greece
Paraguayan expatriate sportspeople in Mexico
Paraguayan expatriate sportspeople in Argentina
Expatriate footballers in Chile
Expatriate footballers in Greece
Expatriate footballers in Mexico
Expatriate footballers in Panama
Expatriate footballers in Argentina
Club Atlético Colón footballers